H+: The Digital Series (often abbreviated as H+) is an American web series produced by Bryan Singer and created by John Cabrera and Cosimo De Tommaso. The series explores a dystopian near future brought about by a technological singularity holocaust from the perspective of differing transhumanism factions, premiered on August 8, 2012 on YouTube with two episodes. Two new episodes were then released every week on Wednesdays until the season finale on January 16, 2013. A second season was announced in January 2013. However, there have been no updates since.

Production
The series began as a long-term project in 2006. It was filmed in Santiago, Chile in 2011, over 29 days in 54 different locations, and announced at the 2011 San Diego Comic-Con International. At the 2012 San Diego Comic-Con, it was again promoted in anticipation of its upcoming premiere. The series is distributed by Warner Brothers Digital Distribution in partnership with YouTube.

As new episodes premiered weekly via YouTube, new supplemental content was also made available through the series' official website, providing extra images, text, or video that tied into the story further.

Background
The series is based on a future where one-third of the world's population has a neural implant named H+, which connects the human mind to the Internet 24 hours a day. The implant was created by a company called Hplus Nano Teoranta, an Irish biotechnology company founded with the intent of improving the medical sector with technology.

The story begins in medias res (i.e. In the midst of the plot.), depicting the effects of a malicious-hacker's computer virus which infects all of the users of the H+ neural implant, killing-off one-third of the world's population.

Concurrent episodes go back-and-forward in time to different settings, and various characters' viewpoints are used to tell the story.

Cast and characters
 Alexis Denisof as Conall Sheehan
 Caitriona Balfe as Breanna Sheehan
 Hannah Simone as Leena Param
 Karrien Marsukhan as Ritu Param
 Amir Arison as Y. Gurveer
Bhavna Kewlani as Mrs.Param
 David Clayton Rogers as Kenneth Lubahn
 Francesca Fanti as Simona Rossi
 Nikki Crawford as Julie Martin
 Sean Gunn as Jason O'Brien
 Samuli Vauramo as Topi Kuusela
 Hannah Herzsprung as Manta
 Francesco Martino as Matteo Spina
 Melvin Abston as Lee Martin
 Lela Loren as Francesca Rossi
 James Urbaniak as Francis Peters
 Carlos Bravo as Ichiro
 Benjamin Clarke as Peters
 Eduardo Burle Sussely as Patricio Raiz
 John Cabrera as Andy

Episodes

Reception
Tubefilter wrote, "easily one of the most epic, well shot, well thought through web series released this year."

Geek Speak Magazine called the series "the official embracement of the web series as a viable creative alternative to films and television."

References

External links

2010s YouTube series
2012 web series debuts
2013 web series endings
American science fiction web series
Brain–computer interfacing in fiction
Post-apocalyptic web series
Postcyberpunk
Streamy Award-winning channels, series or shows
Television series by Bad Hat Harry Productions
Television series by Warner Bros. Television Studios
Television shows filmed in Chile
Transhumanism in television series